Roger J. Thomas was a solar physicist who worked at NASA for many years. He was an internationally recognized expert on the design of extreme ultraviolet spectrographs, and received the prestigious NASA Exceptional Service Medal in 2009.

References

Recipients of the NASA Exceptional Service Medal
1942 births
2015 deaths